Calvary Episcopal Church is a historic Episcopal church on North Street west of Moon Hill Road in McDonough, Chenango County, New York. It was built about 1884 and is a small, one story frame chapel in the Carpenter Gothic style.  It is approximately 28 feet wide and 64 feet deep and features board and batten siding and a steep gable roof with bell tower.

It was added to the National Register of Historic Places in 1998.

References

Episcopal church buildings in New York (state)
Churches on the National Register of Historic Places in New York (state)
Carpenter Gothic church buildings in New York (state)
Churches completed in 1884
19th-century Episcopal church buildings
Churches in Chenango County, New York
National Register of Historic Places in Chenango County, New York